"Time's Up" is a song written by Kevin Welch, Wendy Waldman and Harry Stinson, and recorded by American country music group Southern Pacific and country singer Carlene Carter.  It was released in December 1989 as the second single from Southern Pacific's album County Line.  The song reached number 26 on the Billboard Hot Country Singles & Tracks chart.

Chart performance

References

1989 singles
Southern Pacific (band) songs
Carlene Carter songs
Songs written by Wendy Waldman
Songs written by Kevin Welch
Song recordings produced by Jim Ed Norman
Warner Records singles
Songs written by Harry Stinson (musician)
1989 songs
Vocal collaborations